Theodore Modeste (born 4 July 1979) is a Trinidadian cricketer. He played in six first-class and four List A matches for Trinidad and Tobago from 2000 to 2007.

See also
 List of Trinidadian representative cricketers

References

External links
 

1979 births
Living people
Trinidad and Tobago cricketers